Haliotis jacnensis, common name Jacna abalone, is a species of sea snail, a marine gastropod mollusk in the family Haliotidae, the abalones.

Description
The shell size varies between 7 mm and 25 mm. The oblong-ovate shell is spirally peculiarly rudely ridged. The ridges are very irregular and rather scaly, somewhat smooth next the perforations which are slightly tubiferous and distant. The coloration is reddish-orange. The interior surface is silvery. This is a very characteristic species, to which there is little or no approximation in any other.

Subspecies
 Haliotis jacnensis jacnensis Reeve, 1846
 Haliotis jacnensis kershawi Owen, 2012

Distribution
This species is distributed in the Western Pacific Ocean.

References

 Geiger D.L. & Poppe G.T. (2000). A Conchological Iconography: The family Haliotidae. Conchbooks, Hackenheim Germany. 135pp 83pls.
 Geiger D.L. & Owen B. (2012) Abalone: Worldwide Haliotidae. Hackenheim: Conchbooks. viii + 361 pp. [29 February 2012] page(s): 53

External links
 

jacnensis
Molluscs of the Pacific Ocean
Gastropods described in 1846
Taxa named by Lovell Augustus Reeve